Abbasabad-e Amin (also Romanized as ‘Abbāsābād-e Amīn; also known as Abbas Abad Amini and ) is a village in Koshkuiyeh Rural District, Koshkuiyeh District, Rafsanjan County, Kerman Province, Iran. At the 2006 census, its population was 282, in 68 families.

References 

Populated places in Rafsanjan County